The pedestrian bridge in Osijek, Croatia spans the Drava River. It is one of the most notable symbols of Osijek.

History 

The bridge was opened in 1981. It was designed by Mostgradnja, a Belgrade-based company.

From 1981 to 1991, the bridge was named "Youth Bridge". In 1991, the bridge was renamed to current name. It was damaged in the Croatian War of Independence, during the Battle of Osijek, and underwent repair in 1993. In 2007, the bridge was completely renovated.

Sources 
 

Bridges in Croatia
Bridges over the Drava
Bridges completed in 1981
Footbridges
Buildings and structures in Osijek
Pedestrian infrastructure in Croatia
Tourist attractions in Osijek